The Nature Heritage Fund is a funding body of the New Zealand Government set up in 1990 for the purchase of land which has significant ecological or landscape value.

It is administered by the Department of Conservation, but controlled by the Minister of Conservation. It was initially called the Forest Heritage Fund but the name was changed in 1998 to reflect the need to protect ecosystems other than forests, for example wetlands, tussocklands and shrublands. Funding has declined sharply; while $10m per annum was allocated in the early 2000s, this has reduced to $2m per year in 2016.

In its first 25 years, the fund has purchased and protected  of land, which represents 1.3% of New Zealand's land area. Since its inception, the fund has been chaired by Di Lucas, a landscape architect from Christchurch.

References

External links
Nature Heritage Fund Department of Conservation

Nature conservation organisations based in New Zealand
Funding bodies of New Zealand